Alma Theodora Lee (née Melvaine; born 12 April 1912, Tingha, died 20 October 1990, Wellington) was an Australian botanist and plant taxonomist who worked at the National Herbarium of New South Wales, University of Sydney, and CSIRO.  She is notable for raising the standard of systematic botany in Australia, and for her revisions of Swainsona and Typha.  She also studied the Fabaceae with colleagues.   She described over 40 species.  The March 1991 issue of the journal Telopea was dedicated to her memory.

References 

1912 births
1990 deaths
Australian women scientists
20th-century Australian botanists
Women botanists
20th-century women scientists
People from New England (New South Wales)
University of Sydney people
CSIRO people
20th-century Australian women